Jakub Selnar (born 13 April 2000) is a Czech professional footballer who plays as a right winger for Czech National Football League club Vysočina Jihlava.

Career

Club career
Selnar is a product of Viktoria Plzeň. A profile on the clubs reserve, Selnar was called up for his first professional game on 26 May 2019 - a game against Baník Ostrava. However, he didn't get any playing time in that game. To gain some experience, Selnar was loaned out to Baník Sokolov in the summer 2019, until the end of the year. After returning from the loan spell, Selnar began training with Viktoria Plzeň's first team in January 2020. However, a few days later, he was loaned out to FK Pardubice. He played in only one match, before returning to Plzeň again in the spring.

In January 2021, Selnar was loaned out again, this time to FC Vysočina Jihlava until the end of July 2021, with a purchase option. On 19 July 2021, the club confirmed that they had triggered the purchase option and signed Selnar permanently.

References

External links
 

2000 births
Living people
Czech footballers
Czech Republic youth international footballers
Association football wingers
Right to Dream Academy players
FC Viktoria Plzeň players
FK Baník Sokolov players
FK Pardubice players
FC Vysočina Jihlava players
Czech National Football League players